Pierre Lamer (December 27, 1873 – October 24, 1931) was a professional baseball player. He played parts of two seasons in Major League Baseball, for the Chicago Orphans in 1902 and the Cincinnati Reds in 1907, primarily as a catcher.

External links 

Major League Baseball catchers
Chicago Orphans players
Cincinnati Reds players
New London Whalers players
Providence Clamdiggers (baseball) players
Hartford Indians players
Wooden Nutmegs players
Syracuse Stars (minor league baseball) players
Meriden Miler players
Providence Grays (minor league) players
Baseball players from New York (state)
1873 births
1931 deaths
Burials at Cypress Hills Cemetery